Jeremy John Mahony (pronounced Marny) (born 1955) is a former British auto racing driver, best known for driving a Ford Sierra RS500 in the British Touring Car Championship under the Arquati Racing banner. He first competed in the BTCC in 1988, and won his very first race at Silverstone. That however would prove to be his only win, but he challenged consistently in his first season, finishing second in class to Andy Rouse. The following season was marred by bad luck and unreliability, and a switch to a BMW M3 in 1990 did little to reverse his fortunes. He quit the sport halfway through the season. He turned his attention to his business interests, including corporate entertainments. He was arrested in 2005 alongside Vic Lee, and was jailed for 11 years on drug trafficking charges.

Racing record

Complete British Touring Car Championship results
(key) (Races in bold indicate pole position in class) (Races in italics indicate fastest lap in class - 1 point awarded 1987-1989 all races)

Complete European Touring Car Championship results
(key) (Races in bold indicate pole position) (Races in italics indicate fastest lap)

References

1956 births
Living people
British Touring Car Championship drivers
Place of birth missing (living people)